Transmembrane protein 51 is a protein in humans that is encoded by the TMEM51 gene.

References

Further reading